Botryoid odontogenic cyst is a variant of the lateral periodontal cyst.  It is more often found in middle-aged and older adults, and the teeth more likely affected are mandibular (lower) canines and premolars.  On radiographs, the cyst appears "grape-like". Often patients with this condition are symptomatic. 


Radiographic features
The botryoid odontogenic cyst is a multi-compartmentalized variant of the lateral periodontal cyst.  It is similar to the lateral periodontal cyst in all its features except that its polycystic nature is often evident through its multilocular pattern on radiographs.

Histologic features
Histologically also it resembles the lateral periodontal cyst which has a distinctive thin, nonkeratinized epithelium which is 1-5 cell layers thick and resembles the reduced enamel epithelium. 
 Cuboidal or columnar cells may be found composing the lining.
 Focal thickened plaques of proliferating lining cells often project into the lumen areas which is commonly seen in this cyst.
 Large number of rests of dental lamina are found in the connective tissue composed of glycogen rich clear cells.
reference can be made to the histologic details given by shear and pindborg

References

 Kahn, Michael A. Basic Oral and Maxillofacial Pathology. Volume 1. 2001.
 shafer's textbook of oral pathology 5th edition

Cysts of the oral and maxillofacial region